This is a list of heads of state and government who died in office. In general, hereditary office holders (kings, queens, emperors, emirs, and the like) and  holders of offices where the normal term limit is life (popes, presidents for life, etc.) are excluded because, until recently, their death in office was the norm.

Such deaths have most often been from natural causes, but there are also cases of assassination, execution, suicide, accident and even death in battle.

The list is in chronological order. The name is listed first, followed by the year of death, the country, the name of the office the person held at the time of death, the location of the death (where known) and the cause of death.

Prior to 1850

1850–1899

1900–1949

1950–1999

2000–present

See also
 List of assassinated and executed heads of state and government
 List of presidents of the United States who died in office
 List of Russian governors who died in office

References

Heads of state and government who died in office
Heads of state and government who died in office
Death
Death
Heads